Joseph Weeks Babcock (March 6, 1850 – April 27, 1909) was a seven-term Republican member of the United States House of Representatives from Wisconsin.

Born in Swanton, Vermont. Babcock was the grandson of Joseph Weeks, a Congressman from Vermont. He grew up in Butler County, Iowa, where he started his lumber career working at his father's lumberyard. In 1881 he moved to Necedah, Wisconsin, where he amassed a fortune during his 17 years as manager and secretary of the Necedah Lumber Company, and served in the Wisconsin State Assembly from 1888 to 1892.

He married Mary Finch, a native of Clinton, Iowa, and the daughter of C. C. Finch. They resided for many years in Necedah, Wisconsin, where Babcock was in the lumber business. They had a son, Charles, and a daughter, Amelia. The Babcocks owned a residence on Capitol Hill facing the capitol grounds.

In 1892, Babcock was elected to the 53rd United States Congress from Wisconsin's 3rd congressional district and was reelected to the six subsequent congresses as well serving from March 4, 1893 till March 3, 1907. In 1893, he helped organize the Republican Congressional Campaign Committee; he was credited with helping achieve Republican successes in the 1894 House elections, and was chairman of the committee for the next ten years. He was a candidate for Speaker of the House in 1902, but lost to Joseph Cannon. He was defeated for reelection in 1906 by Democrat James William Murphy. Speeches on "History of Money and Financial Legislature in the United States" and "Three Evenings with Silver and Money" were published in pamphlet form by him in 1896.

He continued to live in Washington, D.C., where in 1909 he died at the age of 59 after suffering for several weeks from liver and kidney problems.

Sources

American National Biography, vol. 1, pp. 811–812.
 Wisconsin Historical Society biography
Men of Mark in America Biography

1850 births
1909 deaths
People from Swanton (town), Vermont
Republican Party members of the United States House of Representatives from Wisconsin
Republican Party members of the Wisconsin State Assembly
People from Butler County, Iowa
People from Necedah, Wisconsin
19th-century American politicians